Sivakamiyin Selvan is a 1974 Indian Tamil-language film directed by C. V. Rajendran, starring Sivaji Ganesan, Vanisri and Latha. It is a remake of the Hindi film Aradhana (1969). The film was released on 26 January 1974.

Plot 
Indian Air Force pilot Flight Lieutenant Ashok is in love with Sivagami. They have a secret wedding and Sivagami becomes pregnant. Ashok dies in a plane crash. Sivagami tells her father about her pregnancy. But soon he dies too. Sivagami is now alone with her newborn child. Out of fear from people tagging him an illegitimate child, she puts him in the doors of an orphanage, with the idea of adopting the same child next day. Before she can adopt him, a rich man whose wife had already lost many children and had lost one again, comes to the orphanage to adopt that child. After knowing this Sivagami goes to the rich man's house and tells him about her past. He asks her to work as a servant. He emphasises that this must not be told to his wife, who is fond of the child, Ananth. She promises him that she would not. Meanwhile, the wife's brother sees Sivagami and wants to marry her. When she rejects his proposal, he tries to rape her. Her son kills him with a scissors. Sivagami tells the child to leave and holds the scissors alleged that she had killed him. She is arrested.

20 years later, Sivagami is released. Meanwhile, the rich man's wife learns of Sivagami's history from her husband. She is shocked and wants her to be immediately released from prison. Sivagami returns to their home. A girl living there, Kavitha sees Sivagami. They get along well. She takes Sivagami to the airport to meet her fiancé who turns out to be Ananth. However he does not recognise her as he was much younger when he saw her last time. One day he finds a diary and sees pictures of his father, his mother and himself with his mother. Then he remembers Sivagami and asks her to come to his awards ceremony. During the ceremony, he asks his mother to present him the award to which she obliges. The film ends with both Sivagami and Ananth on the stage.

Cast 
Sivaji Ganesan as Ashok and Ananth
Vanisri as Sivakami
Latha as Kavitha
A. V. M. Rajan as Wing Commander Raghu
S. V. Ranga Rao as Chakravarthi
S. V. Sahasranamam as Dr. Ramanathan
T. K. Bhagavathi as Sankar
M. N. Rajam as Parvathi
R. S. Manohar as America Mama
V. S. Raghavan as Kavitha's father
Srikanth as Ravi
Cho as Sigamani
V. Nagayya as Church Father
Senthamarai as Climax Lawyer
S. N. Parvathy as Eswari
A. K. Veerasami as Ashok's uncle
Usilai Mani as Iyer
Master Srikumar as young Ananth

Production 
Sivagamiyin Selvan, a remake of the Hindi film Aradhana (1969), is the only film where Sivaji Ganesan and Latha acted together.

Soundtrack 
The music was composed by M. S. Viswanathan.

Release and reception 
Sivagamiyin Selvan was released on 26 January 1974. Kumudam positively reviewed the film, comparing it favourably to the Hindi original.

References

External links 
 

1970s Tamil-language films
1974 films
Films directed by C. V. Rajendran
Films scored by M. S. Viswanathan
Indian Air Force in films
Tamil remakes of Hindi films